Mick Aherne was a Gaelic football and hurling player from County Laois in Ireland.

He played for many years on the Laois senior football and hurling teams in the defence.

In 1986, he starred on the Laois senior football team that won the county's second National Football League title

A native of Ballacolla, Mick played his club hurling with Ballacolla and his club football with the O'Dempsey's club with whom he played a leading role in 1980 when the club won its second Laois Senior Football Championship title.

References
 Comhairle Laighean 1900-2000 Tom Ryall, 2000
 Complete Handbook of Gaelic Games Raymond Smith, 1999
 Laois GAA Yearbook 1999 Leinster Express, 1999

Year of birth missing (living people)
Living people
Dual players
Laois inter-county Gaelic footballers
Laois inter-county hurlers
Clough-Ballacolla hurlers
O'Dempseys Gaelic footballers